Calingiri is a town located north-east of Perth, near New Norcia in Western Australia. It is in the Shire of Victoria Plains.

The town derives its name from Calingiri Waterhole, the name of which was first recorded by a surveyor in 1903. The settlement was first proposed in 1914. By the time the town was gazetted in 1917 it was variously spelt as Calingtry, Kalingiri, The Washpool, Kalingary, Calingarra, Calingtry, Calingiry, Kalingiry and finally Calingiri.

The main industry in town is wheat farming with the town being a Cooperative Bulk Handling grain receival site.

The Calingiri earthquake, March 1970
The Calingiri earthquake of March 1970 was at the time one of only five known Australian recorded earthquakes to cause surface faulting. 
It was thought to be related to the 1968 Meckering earthquake, but a direct connection was not made at the time.

Date of occurrence: 10 March 1970
Time: 	17:15 UTC (03:15 local time)		
Latitude: 	31.11 South (+/- 10 km)		
Longitude: 	116.46 East (+/- 10 km)
Magnitude:	5.9		
Intensity: VI (Strong)

Environment
An  tract of land around the town has been classified as an Important Bird Area because it supports up to 20 breeding pairs of the endangered Carnaby's Black-Cockatoo.

One of the local reserves near the Calingiri townsite was named after Rica Erickson.

See also
 Earthquakes in Western Australia

References

Further reading
 Buchanan, Bruce (1997) Wannamal: a history Perth [W.A.]: Curtin Printing Services, Curtin University of Technology (history of the district in the Chittering Shire and into Gingin, Bindoon, Calingiri, Wongan Hills and north to Three Springs)

External links

 A history of earthquakes in Western Australia

Towns in Western Australia
Earthquakes in Western Australia
Grain receival points of Western Australia
Shire of Victoria Plains